Faery Tale Adventure II: Halls of the Dead is a video game developed by American studio The Dreamers Guild and published by Encore Software in 1997 for MS-DOS and Microsoft Windows. It is the sequel to the 1987 game The Faery Tale Adventure. It was the last game developed by The Dreamers Guild before the studio's closure.

Gameplay
Faery Tale Adventure II: Halls of the Dead continues the exploits of three brothers – strong Julian, agile Phillip, and wise Kevin, as they once again try to rid the world of evil.

Development
The game was showcased at E3 1997.

Reception

Next Generation gave the MS-DOS version two stars out of five, and stated "All in all, unless your desire for adventure outweighs your desire for a game with a sane interface, give this one a miss." Michael Wolf of PC Gamer US was similarly unimpressed, writing that "hungry roleplaying fans will have to wait for the next offering to come along." In Computer Games Strategy Plus, Robert Mayer was moderately more positive, but still found the game flawed.

Reviews
Game.EXE #7 (Jul 1997)
PC Player (Germany) - Apr, 1998

References

External links

1997 video games
Action role-playing video games
DOS games
Encore Software games
ScummVM-supported games
Single-player video games
The Dreamers Guild games
Video games with isometric graphics
Video games developed in the United States
Video game sequels
Windows games